Petre Ivan (born 1927) was a Romanian football goalkeeper.

International career
Petre Ivan played one game for Romania in a friendly which ended with a 4–1 victory against Albania.

Honours
FC Ploiești
Divizia B: 1946–47

Notes

References

External links
Petre Ivan at Labtof.ro

1927 births
Romanian footballers
Romania international footballers
Association football goalkeepers
Liga I players
Liga II players
FC Dinamo București players
FC Petrolul Ploiești players
Unirea Tricolor București players
CS Corvinul Hunedoara players
Possibly living people